Doratoxylon is a genus of flowering plants in the family Sapindaceae.

Species
Species in this genus are:
Doratoxylon alatum  (Radlk.) Capuron 
Doratoxylon apetalum (Poir.) Radlk.
Doratoxylon chouxii  Capuron 
Doratoxylon littorale  Capuron 
Doratoxylon stipulatum  Capuron

References

Sapindaceae genera
Dodonaeoideae